Antonio Šančić and Tristan-Samuel Weissborn were the defending champions but only Weissborn chose to defend his title, partnering Romain Arneodo. Weissborn lost in the quarterfinals to Marco Bortolotti and Sergio Martos Gornés.

Denis Istomin and Evgeny Karlovskiy won the title after defeating Bortolotti and Martos Gornés 6–3, 7–5 in the final.

Seeds

Draw

References

External links
 Main draw

Sparkassen ATP Challenger - Doubles
2022 Doubles